Yousef Al Zaabi (Arabic:يوسف الزعابي) (born 17 July 1997) is an Emirati footballer. He currently plays as a striker.

External links

References

Emirati footballers
1986 births
Living people
Al-Ittihad Kalba SC players
Al Ahli Club (Dubai) players
Al-Nasr SC (Dubai) players
Ajman Club players
Al-Wasl F.C. players
Place of birth missing (living people)
Footballers at the 2006 Asian Games
UAE First Division League players
UAE Pro League players
Association football goalkeepers
Asian Games competitors for the United Arab Emirates